Events from the year 1972 in Portuguese Macau.

Incumbents
 President - Américo Tomás
 Governor - José Manuel de Sousa e Faro Nobre de Carvalho

 
Years of the 20th century in Macau
Macau
Macau
1970s in Macau